The Diary of a Teenage Girl is a 2015 American comedy-drama film written and directed by Marielle Heller, based on the hybrid novel of the same name by Phoebe Gloeckner. It stars Bel Powley as a 15-year-old girl who becomes sexually active by starting a relationship with her mother's boyfriend. It also stars Kristen Wiig, Alexander Skarsgård, Christopher Meloni, Quinn Nagle, and Austin Lyon. It premiered at the 2015 Sundance Film Festival and had a limited release on August 7, 2015 by Sony Pictures Classics.

Plot
In 1976 San Francisco, 15-year-old aspiring cartoonist Minnie begins keeping an audio diary. She is stirred by her awakening sexuality and wants to lose her virginity. She fears she may be unattractive.

When Minnie's bohemian mother Charlotte is too busy to go out with her boyfriend Monroe, she suggests he take Minnie out instead. At a bar, they flirt and she tells him she wants to sleep with him. They begin meeting at his apartment and having sex. She shares the details of her sexual experiences with her friend Kimmie, and records them in her audio diary. 

At a comic book store, Minnie sees cartoonist Aline Kominsky signing books. She mails Aline her first comic, about a woman walking through town.

Minnie sleeps twice with her schoolmate Ricky, but he finds her sexual enthusiasm intimidating. At a bar, Minnie and Kimmie decide to pose as prostitutes. They fellate two boys in the bathroom, but the next day agree it was a bad choice. Minnie's stepfather, Pascal, calls from New York City and invites Minnie to live with him, but she declines.

Charlotte loses her job as a librarian. So, Minnie and her younger sister Gretel ask Pascal for money, and though he is irritated, he sends the family a check. After a wild party, Minnie, Kimmie, and Monroe have a threesome. Kimmie later says it was a one-off as Minnie seems bothered by it. She adds, it's not as if Minnie loves Monroe. 

Minnie realises, and says, that she does love him. She becomes increasingly uncomfortable with her affair with Monroe and he keeps breaking it off saying it is wrong only to continue having sex with her. Yet, when she wants sex, he acts too tired or pushes her down to give him a blow job. Her own satisfaction is a minor consideration.

Minnie goes round to confront Monroe but he says he didn't sleep the night before and needs a nap. Minnie is annoyed but lets him climb into bed. She lies down too and then he coaxes her into talking dirty about a guy she met at the cinema and then asks if it would hurt her if they were to have sex. 

After they have sex and take acid together, Minnie sees herself covered in feathers and flying but Monroe has a bad trip, convinced they are being watched. During the trip he tells Minnie he loves her and she realizes that she no longer cares for him. Monroe begins making plans for them to be together when she is 18 and Minnie leaves him.

Charlotte grows suspicious of the relationship between Minnie and Monroe, but he convinces her that she is imagining things.  Charlotte discovers Minnie's audio diary, and confronts them. She decides that Minnie and Monroe must now marry, which he agrees to. Minnie runs away from home in disgust and begins seeing a risk-taking lesbian, Tabatha. When Tabatha brings her to a drug dealer, having told him that Minnie will have sex with him for the drugs, Minnie returns to her family.

Minnie finds a letter from Aline encouraging her to draw more comics. Selling her comics and zines on the beach, Minnie runs into Monroe. She is cold towards him, and they go their separate ways. She reflects on her emotional growth and realizes that the only way to find happiness is by loving herself, not by depending on another person's affection.

Cast

Production

Development 
Writer and director Heller received Phoebe Gloeckner's graphic novel The Diary of a Teenage Girl as a Christmas gift from her younger sister in 2007. Of the book, Heller said it "just lit something up inside of me when I first read it. It felt closer to capturing what a real teenage girl feels than anything I’d ever read. And there is such a void onscreen of the voices of authentic teenage girls." Over the next few years Heller adapted the graphic novel into a play, in which she played the lead role. Gloeckner gave her consent to Heller's stage adaptation after attending a read-through, saying "[Marielle] created something so moving, and it was the first time I had seen the characters in three dimensions. It was like being in a hologram, seeing ghosts from my past wandering around."  

The play was originally conceived with Rachel Eckerling and then developed from 2007 to 2010 with Eckerling and Sarah Cameron Sunde. Sunde and Eckerling went on to co-direct the full production. The Diary of a Teenage Girl play premiered at 3LD Arts and Technology Center, produced by Aaron Louis in association with New Georges and The Essentials. The production design functioned as an immersive theatrical experience with a carpeted sunken living room and pillows for the audience to sit on, and video and actors' actions took place in a full surround environment. It was critically acclaimed and ran for six weeks in March–April 2010. In adapting the book into a film, Heller went through "roughly 85 drafts" of the script.

Filming 
On January 10, 2014, Kristen Wiig, Alexander Skarsgård, and Bel Powley were reported to have joined the cast of the film as leads. Caviar co-financed with Cold Iron Pictures, and co-produced with Archer Gray Productions. Principal photography began on January 10, 2014 in San Francisco, California, and continued into February.

Release
The film had its world premiere at the Sundance Film Festival on January 24, 2015. Shortly after, it was announced Sony Pictures Classics had acquired distribution rights to the film. The film was given a limited release on August 7, 2015.

In the UK, the film was the subject of some controversy because of the decision of the BBFC to give it an "18" rating.

Reception
On review aggregator Rotten Tomatoes, the film holds an approval rating of 95% based on 164 reviews, with an average rating of 7.93/10. The website's critics consensus reads: "Boldly unconventional and refreshingly honest, Diary of a Teenage Girl is a frank coming-of-age story that addresses its themes—and its protagonist—without judgment." On Metacritic, the film has a weighted average score of 87 out of 100, based on 35 critics, indicating "universal acclaim".

Indiewire described the film as "genuine, poignant and hilarious." The Guardian gave it five out of five stars and called it "morally complex and sometimes uncomfortably close to the bone, but also lushly bawdy and funny, and packaged together with an astonishing degree of cinematic brio." Emily St. James of Vox praised the movie for being “quietly radical”, describing it as “a story of huge emotions and big moments, told via intimate gestures and tiny power shifts”.

Accolades
At the 2015 Berlin International Film Festival, the film won the Grand Prix of Generation 14plus section for best feature-length film.

At the 2015 Independent Spirit Awards, the film won Best First Feature and was nominated for Best First Screenplay and Bel Powley for Best Female Lead.

References

External links
 
 
 
 Official screenplay

2015 films
2010s coming-of-age comedy-drama films
2015 independent films
2015 romantic comedy-drama films
2010s teen comedy-drama films
2010s teen romance films
American coming-of-age comedy-drama films
American films with live action and animation
American independent films
American romantic comedy-drama films
American teen comedy-drama films
American teen romance films
Coming-of-age romance films
Films about comics
Films about virginity
Films based on American comics
Films produced by Anne Carey
Films set in 1976
Films set in San Francisco
Films shot in San Francisco
Sony Pictures Classics films
Films directed by Marielle Heller
2015 directorial debut films
Juvenile sexuality in films
2010s feminist films
2010s English-language films
2010s American films